Pseudopostega mexicana is a moth of the family Opostegidae. It was described by Andrius Remeikis and Jonas R. Stonis in 2009. It is known from the Pacific Coast of Mexico.

The wingspan is 4–4.3 mm for males. Adults have been recorded in November.

Etymology
The species name refers to the country from which the type series originated.

References

Opostegidae
Moths described in 2009